The 2012 Aberto de São Paulo was a professional tennis tournament played on hard courts. It was the twelfth edition of the tournament which is part of the 2012 ATP Challenger Tour. It took place in São Paulo, Brazil between 2 and 8 January 2011.

Singles main-draw entrants

Seeds

 1 Rankings are as of December 26, 2012.

Other entrants
The following players received wildcards into the singles main draw:
  Henrique Cunha
  Daniel Dutra da Silva
  Leonardo Kirche
  Thiago Monteiro

The following players received entry from the qualifying draw:
  Augusto Laranja
  Jose Pereira
  Bruno Sant'anna
  Maximiliano Estévez

Champions

Singles

 Thiago Alves def.  Gastão Elias, 7–6(7–5), 7–6(7–1)

Doubles

 Fernando Romboli /  Júlio Silva def.  Jozef Kovalík /  José Pereira, 7–5, 6–2

External links
Official Website
ITF Search
ATP official site

Aberto de São Paulo
Aberto de São Paulo
Aberto De São Paulo
Aberto De São Paulo